"Don't" is the debut single by American singer Bryson Tiller. It was released on May 20, 2015, as the first single for his debut studio album Trapsoul. The beat was composed and produced by Epikh Pro. The song contains an interpolation "Shake It Off" by Mariah Carey on the second verse. This song peaked at number 13 on the US Billboard Hot 100, where it became Tiller's first top 20 hit.

Background and release
Tiller originally released this song in October 2014 on his SoundCloud page and started receiving attention from internet based fans and music industry insiders, accumulating 4 million streams in the first six months, and eventually reaching over 35 million streams. Tiller, after increased popularity of the single, admitted that he "made this shit in his living room".

Music video
The song's accompanying music video premiered on October 17, 2015, on Tiller's Vevo account on YouTube. Since its release, the video has received over 400 million views.

Chart performance
"Don't" debuted on the Billboard Hot 100 at number 84 for the chart dated October 17, 2015, and peaked at number 13, becoming his first top-twenty single on the chart. On November 16, 2017, the single was certified quadruple platinum by the Recording Industry Association of America (RIAA) for combined sales and streaming equivalent units of over four million copies in the United States.

Charts

Weekly charts

Year-end charts

Certifications

References

External links

2014 songs
2015 debut singles
RCA Records singles
Bryson Tiller songs
Songs written by Bryson Tiller
Songs written by Mariah Carey
Songs written by Johntá Austin
Songs written by Bryan-Michael Cox
Songs written by Jermaine Dupri
Songs written by Vory